Curtis White is an American essayist and author. Most of his career has been spent writing experimental fiction, but he has turned recently to writing books of social criticism.

Books
As author:
Heretical Songs (short fiction) (Fiction Collective, 1981)
Metaphysics in the Midwest (stories) (Sun & Moon, 1989)
The Idea of Home (Sun & Moon, 1993; reprinted by Dalkey Archive Press, 2004)
Anarcho-Hindu (FC2, 1995)
Monstrous Possibility: An Invitation to Literary Politics (Dalkey Archive Press, 1998)
Memories of My Father Watching TV (Dalkey Archive Press, 1998)
Requiem (Dalkey Archive Press, 2001)
The Middle Mind: Why Americans Don't Think for Themselves (HarperSanFrancisco, 2003)
America's Magic Mountain (Dalkey Archive Press, 2004)
The Spirit of Disobedience: Resisting the Charms of Fake Politics, Mindless Consumption, and the Culture of Total Work (PoliPointPress, 2006)
The Barbaric Heart: Faith, Money, and the Crisis of Nature (PoliPointPress, 2009)
The Science Delusion: Asking the Big Questions in a Culture of Easy Answers (Melville House Publishing, 2013)
We Robots: Staying Human in the Age of Big Data (Melville House Publishing, 2015)
Lacking Character: A Novel (Melville House Publishing, March 2018)
Living in a World that Can’t Be Fixed: Reimagining Counterculture Today (Melville House Publishing, November 2019)

As editor:
 American Made (co-edited with Mark Leyner and Thomas Glynn, Fiction Collective, 1986)
An Illuminated History of The Future (FC2, 1989)
In The Slipstream: An FC2 Reader (FC2, 1999) (co-edited with Ronald Sukenick)

References

External links

Essays and interviews
"The Middle Mind", in CONTEXT
"Saving Private Ryan : Don't try to do no thinkin'!", in CONTEXT
"Chickening Out. Fear and loathing in the academy: Ward Churchill faces the dilemma of the holy whore", essay, in Village Voice, 2005.
"In the Sharkcage with Curtis White" : an interview by Trevor Dodge at Alt-X
"An Interview with Curtis White" : an interview by Ben Kuebrich for OxMag, May 2007.
"Largehearted Boy Book Notes essay : a music playlist for The Barbaric Heart at Largehearted Boy
The spirit of disobedience: an invitation to resistance, Harper's Magazine, April 1, 2006

Audio
Lecture at Clackamas Community College, (March 14, 2007)

Also
Vol. XVIII, no. 2 of the Review of Contemporary Fiction contains numerous essays on Curtis White's career and books.

American humanities academics
American literary theorists
American essayists
American non-fiction writers
Illinois State University faculty
People from Normal, Illinois
Year of birth missing (living people)
Living people
American academics of English literature